The 2017 Pingshan Open was a professional tennis tournament played on outdoor hard courts. It was the fourth (ATP) and third (ITF) editions of the tournament and was part of the 2017 ATP Challenger Tour and the 2017 ITF Women's Circuit, offering $75,000+H (ATP) and $60,000 (ITF) in prize money. It was held in Shenzhen, China, from 13–19 March 2017.

Men's singles main draw entrants

Seeds 

 1 Rankings as of 6 March 2017.

Other entrants 
The following players received wildcards into the singles main draw:
  Bai Yan
  Chuhan Wang
  Zhang Zhizhen
  Zheng Wei Qiang

The following player received entry into the singles main draw as an alternate:
  Yasutaka Uchiyama

The following player received entry into the singles main draw using a protected ranking:
  Yuki Bhambri

The following players received entry from the qualifying draw:
  Hubert Hurkacz
  Axel Michon
  Roman Safiullin
  Franko Škugor

Women's singles main draw entrants

Seeds 

 1 Rankings as of 6 March 2017

Other entrants 
The following players received wildcards into the singles main draw:
  Lu Jiajing
  Zhang Ying
  Zhang Yukun
  Zhang Yuxuan

The following players received entry from the qualifying draw:
  Luksika Kumkhum
  Vera Lapko
  Lu Jingjing
  Jessica Pieri

Champions

Men's singles

 Yūichi Sugita def.  Blaž Kavčič 7–6(8–6), 6–4.

Women's singles

 Ekaterina Alexandrova def.  Aryna Sabalenka, 6–2, 7–5

Men's doubles

 Sanchai Ratiwatana /  Sonchat Ratiwatana def.  Hsieh Cheng-peng /  Christopher Rungkat 6–2, 6–7(5–7), [10–6].

Women's doubles

 Lyudmyla Kichenok /  Nadiia Kichenok def.  Eri Hozumi /  Valeria Savinykh 6–4, 6–4.

External links 
 2017 Pingshan Open at ITFtennis.com

2017
2017 in Chinese tennis
2017 ITF Women's Circuit
2017 ATP Challenger Tour